Agyneta tenuipes is a species of sheet weaver found in Japan. It was described by Ono in 2007.

References

tenuipes
Spiders described in 2007
Spiders of Asia
Chelicerates of Japan